Sahyadria chalakkudiensis is a species of cyprinid fish endemic to the Chalakkudy River, Kerala, India in the Western Ghats where it can be found in well-vegetated upper reaches of rivers.  This species can reach a length of  TL. It resembles the related S. denisonii, but the colours of S. chalakkudiensis are less intense.

This fish along with S. denisonii is also known as Miss Kerala due to its bright color band and shiny scales. It is endangered by the international pet trade, habitat alteration, fisheries, and invasive fish. The presence of a black marking in the dorsal-fin identifies this species from P. denisonii.

References 

Sahyadria
Freshwater fish of India
Endemic fauna of the Western Ghats
Taxa named by Ambat Gopalan Kutty Menon
Taxa named by Karunakaran Rema Devi
Fish described in 1999
Species endangered by the pet trade